Events in the year 2023 in Estonia.

Incumbents
President: Alar Karis
Prime Minister: Kaja Kallas

Events
Ongoing — COVID-19 pandemic in Estonia

23 January – Estonia announces the expulsion of the Russian ambassador in Tallinn to reciprocate Russia's expulsion of the Estonian ambassador in Moscow due to a "downgrade" of relations. Both envoys will depart their respective assignments on February 7.
5 March – 2023 Estonian parliamentary election: The Reform Party, led by Kaja Kallas, wins the most seats in the Riigikogu.

Sport
Basketball
2022–23 European North Basketball League
2022–23 Latvian–Estonian Basketball League

Football

Ice hockey
2022–23 EML season

Deaths

January 
1 January - Kadri Mälk, 64, artist and jewellery designer
10 January - Kalle Eller, 82, publisher, cultural researcher and poet
7 February - Mati Põldre, 86, film director (Those Old Love Letters, Georg), screenwriter and cinematographer.

References

 
2020s in Estonia
Years of the 21st century in Estonia
Estonia
Estonia